Molestia is a genus of East Asian dwarf spiders that was first described by L. H. Tu, Michael I. Saaristo & S. Q. Li in 2006.

Species 
 it contains five species, found in China and France:

 Molestia ancoraria Irfan, Zhang & Peng, 2022 – China
 Molestia caudata Irfan, Zhang & Peng, 2022 – China
 Molestia hamifera (Simon, 1884) – France, China
 Molestia molesta (Tao, Li & Zhu, 1995) (type) – China
 Molestia yaojiapingensis Irfan, Zhang & Peng, 2022 – China

See also
 List of Linyphiidae species (I–P)

References

Linyphiidae
Spiders of China